Nik Bärtsch (born 3 August 1971) is a Swiss pianist, composer, bandleader, record producer and author from Zürich.

Career 

Bärtsch studied piano and percussion before the age of ten, prior to his studies at the Academy of Music, he was taught for 5 years (1986-1991) by Boris Mersson (1921-2013). Then he went to the Zurich Musikhochschule where he graduated in 1997. Additionally, he studied linguistics, musicology, and philosophy at the University of Zurich from 1998 to 2001. He grew interested in the work of avant-garde composers John Cage, Steve Reich, and Morton Feldman. He formed his band Mobile in 1997, and his band Ronin in 2001. Manfred Eicher signed the band Ronin to his label, ECM Records, and released 2006 the first album Stoa. During the next year, Bärtsch became co-owner of a club in Zurich. Bärtsch's music has been called zen funk, but with the album Llyria, he moved toward contemporary classical music. He was instructor of Practical Aesthetics at the Musikhochschule Zurich-Winterthur from 2000–2003.

Bärtsch lives with his wife, a biologist with a doctorate, shiatsu therapist as well as aikido teacher, and his three daughters in Zurich, where he plays every Monday in "Exil."

Influences and style 
Repetition and change are central motifs in Nik Bärtsch's music and performance practice.

Nik Bärtsch's work is at the intersection of contemporary music, jazz and funk influences. The use of repetition, as well as structures based on interweaving elements in his music suggests the influence of minimalist music, and in particular of Steve Reich. Bärtsch is also influenced by oriental philosophy and the ostinato of James Brown. He has also taken a close interest in the work of the American composers John Cage and Morton Feldman.

Bärtsch is fascinated by the Japanese Zen culture. His musical attitude is also influenced by his interest in the Japanese martial art (Aikido) and Zen, among other things. It is his Zen practice of awareness that does not get lost in the multiple, but reduces the multiple as much as possible and concentrates on the essential.

For all the diversity of its influences, this music always reveals its own signature. Although elements from a wide variety of musical worlds have found their way into it - from funk and jazz to new classical music and the sounds of Japanese ritual music - these forms are not juxtaposed or quoted in a postmodern way, but rather merge to form a new style. The result is a grooving, tonally and rhythmically highly differentiated music, composed of a few phrases and motifs that are combined and overlaid in ever new and varied ways.

At the European jazz competition of the german Leverkusen Jazztage in 1995, Bärtsch reached the finals with Menico Ferrari's band Groove Cooperative. In 1999 and 2002 he was awarded the UBS Culture Foundation Promotion Prize. In 2002 he was awarded the Werkjahr of the Swiss city of Zurich. In 2004 he received the culture prize of the municipality of Zollikon (recognition prize). In 2007 he received a composition commission from Pro Helvetia for a music and dance program with Hideto Heshiki. Bärtsch was simultaneously supported by Pro Helvetia as part of the Priority Jazz Promotion 2007-2009. In 2015 he was nominated for the Swiss Music Prize of the Federal Office of Culture.  In 2016 he won the category "Rising Stars Keyboards" of DownBeat magazine. In 2019 he received the Art Prize of the City of Zurich. In 2021 he won an award from DownBeat magazine for the second time, this time in the "Critics Poll" in the category "Rising star piano" piano". These awards are among the most important prizes in the jazz world.

Discography

As sideman
With Menico Ferrari
 About Roses and Thorns (Unit, 1995)

With Don Li 
 Gen (Tonus Music, 2004)

As producer
We Need to Repeat, Ingrid Lukas (Ronin Rhythm, 2009)
RACE, Dee Day Dub (Ronin Rhythm, 2014)
Demimonde, Ingrid Lukas (Ronin Rhythm Records 2015)
Echo, Ikarus (Ronin Rhythm Records 2015)

Books 

 Nik Bärtsch: Listening - Music, Movement, Mind.  Lars Müller publishers,  Zürich 2021, ISBN 978-3-03778-670-3

References

External links 
 Official website of Nik Bärtsch
 Listening as a state of presence in music and martial arts
 Commitment, Movement, and the Batman Spirit
 Seductive Dramaturgy

1971 births
Living people
ECM Records artists
Swiss jazz musicians
20th-century Swiss people
Zurich University of the Arts alumni
Jazz bandleaders
Minimal music
Funk musicians